Maher Magri (born 22 January 1986 in El Kef) is a Tunisian footballer.

Magri signed for Espérance Sportive de Tunis in August 2006 as a 20-year-old and played in the Tunisian Ligue Professionnelle 1 for four years before moving to Tennis Borussia Berlin in September 2010 on a free transfer.

Magri has one cap for the Tunisian U-21 national football team.

Honours 
 Tunisian Ligue Professionnelle 1 champions with Espérance Sportive de Tunis in 2008–09, and 2009–10

References 

1986 births
Living people
Tunisian footballers
Association football midfielders
Espérance Sportive de Tunis players
Tennis Borussia Berlin players
Tunisian expatriate footballers
Expatriate footballers in Germany